Otto Erdmann (16 November 1898 – 23 January 1965) was a German art director. During the 1920s and 1930s he often worked alongside Hans Sohnle.

Filmography

 The Weather Station (1923)
 Horrido (1924)
 The Girl from Capri (1924)
 Mother and Child (1924)
 The Stolen Professor (1924)
 The Woman in Flames (1924)
 Prater (1924)
 Joyless Street (1925)
 The Golden Calf (1925)
 Shadows of the Metropolis (1925)
 Flight Around the World (1925)
 The Third Squadron (1926)
 The Poacher (1926)
 The Great Duchess (1926)
 Tea Time in the Ackerstrasse (1926)
 Professor Imhof (1926)
 The Marriage Hotel (1926)
 Circus Romanelli (1926)
 The Pride of the Company (1926)
 The Woman Who Couldn't Say No (1927)
 The Impostor (1927)
 The Bordello in Rio (1927)
 The City of a Thousand Delights (1927)
 Hello Caesar! (1927)
 The White Slave (1927)
 Queen of the Boulevards (1927)
 Light-Hearted Isabel (1927)
 The Republic of Flappers (1928)
 The Carousel of Death (1928)
 Five Anxious Days (1928)
 The Secret Courier (1928)
 The Lady and the Chauffeur (1928)
 Pawns of Passion (1928)
 The Devious Path (1928)
 Orient (1928)
 A Girl with Temperament (1928)
 The Countess of Sand (1928)
 Who Invented Divorce? (1928)
 Scampolo (1928)
 The Story of a Little Parisian (1928)
 The Veil Dancer (1929)
 The Adjutant of the Czar (1929)
 Mascots (1929)
 Their Son (1929)
 Land Without Women (1929)
 Love in the Ring (1930)
 Alraune (1930)
 The Ring of the Empress (1930)
 Only on the Rhine (1930)
 The Great Longing (1930)
 Road to Rio (1931)
 Der Stumme von Portici (1931)
 Das gelbe Haus des King-Fu (1931)
 The Scoundrel (1931)
 Marriage with Limited Liability (1931)
 My Wife, the Impostor (1931)
 A Night in Paradise (1932)
 The Mad Bomberg (1932)
 The Cruel Mistress (1932)
 Should We Wed Them? (1932)
 Scampolo (1932)
 The Peak Scaler (1933)
 Inge and the Millions (1933)
 Hans Westmar (1933)
 Madame Wants No Children (1933)
 Die kleine Schwindlerin (1933)
 Ein gewisser Herr Gran (1933)
 A Day Will Come (1934)
 The Black Whale (1934)
  (1934)
 Just Once a Great Lady (1934)
 My Life for Maria Isabella (1935)
 One Too Many on Board (1935)
 The Higher Command (1935)
 Regine (1935)
 Wer wagt - gewinnt (1935)
 Escapade (1936)
 A Hoax (1936)
 A Woman of No Importance (1936)
 Woman's Love—Woman's Suffering (1937)
 Fridericus (1937)
 Fremdenheim Filoda (1937)
 Das große Abenteuer (1938)
 Wie einst im Mai (1938)
 The Impossible Mister Pitt (1938)
 Eine Frau kommt in die Tropen (1938)
 Target in the Clouds (1939)
 Die Stimme aus dem Äther (1939)
 The Fox of Glenarvon (1940)
 You Only You (1941)
 Her Other Self (1941)
 My Life for Ireland (1941)
 A Gust of Wind (1942)
 The Big Shadow (1942)
 Symphonie eines Lebens (1943)
 Romance in a Minor Key (1943)
 Ich habe von dir geträumt (1944)
 The Concert (1944)
 Philharmonic (1944)
 Somewhere in Berlin (1946)
 Marriage in the Shadows (1947)
 No Place for Love (1947)
 The Adventures of Fridolin (1948)
 The Court Concert (1948)
 The Beaver Coat (1949)
 Don't Dream, Annette (1949)
 The Merry Wives of Windsor (1950)
  (1950)
 Story of a Young Couple (1952)
 Destinies of Women (1952)
 Die Störenfriede (1953)
 Ernst Thälmann (1954)
 Thomas Muentzer (1956)
 My Father, the Actor (1956)
 Stresemann (1957)
 Lockvogel der Nacht (1959)
 Morgen wirst du um mich weinen (1959)
 The Black Chapel (1959)
 Strafbataillon 999 (1960)
 Brandenburg Division (1960)
 The Return of Doctor Mabuse (1961)
 Blind Justice (1961)
 Auf Wiedersehen (1961)

References

Bibliography

External links

1898 births
1965 deaths
German art directors
Film people from Berlin